Mohamed Aidara (born 6 November 1996) is an Ivorian professional footballer who plays as a centre-back for the club Vizela in the Primeira Liga.

Career
Aidara began his senior career with the Ivorian club ASEC Mimosas, scoring 3 goals in 22 games in his debut season. He was transferred to Vizela on 19 July 2017. He helped Vizela achieve successive promotions from the Campeonato de Portugal to the Primeira Liga. He made his professional debut with Vizela in a 2–1 Segunda Liga win over Oliveirense on 12 September 2020.

References

External links
 
 
 Liga Portugal Profile

1996 births
Living people
Footballers from Abidjan
Ivorian footballers
Association football defenders
F.C. Vizela players
ASEC Mimosas players
Primeira Liga players
Liga Portugal 2 players
Campeonato de Portugal (league) players
Ligue 1 (Ivory Coast) players
Ivorian expatriate footballers
Ivorian expatriate sportspeople in Portugal
Expatriate footballers in Portugal